A New Testament uncial is a section of the New Testament in Greek or Latin majuscule letters, written on parchment or vellum. This style of writing is called Biblical Uncial or Biblical Majuscule.

New Testament uncials are distinct from other ancient texts based on the following differences:
 New Testament papyri – written on papyrus and generally more ancient
 New Testament minuscules – written in minuscule letters and generally more recent
 New Testament lectionaries – usually written in minuscule (but some in uncial) letters and generally more recent
 New Testament uncials – written in majuscule letters, on parchment or vellum.

Classification of uncials 
In 1751, New Testament theologian Johann Jakob Wettstein knew of only 23 uncial codices of the New Testament. By 1859, Constantin von Tischendorf had increased that number to 64 uncials, and in 1909 Caspar René Gregory enumerated 161 uncial codices. By 1963, Kurt Aland, in his Kurzgefasste Liste, had enumerated 250, then in 1989, finally, 299 uncials.

Wettstein inaugurated the modern method of classification. He used capital Latin letters to identify the uncials. Codex Alexandrinus received the letter "A", Codex Vaticanus – "B", Codex Ephraemi – "C", Codex Bezae – "D", until he arrived at the last letter used by him, "O". Succeeding generations used this pattern, but newly discovered manuscripts soon exhausted the Latin alphabet. As a result, letters of the Greek and Hebrew alphabets began to be used. Tischendorf, for example, assigned the Codex Sinaiticus the Hebrew letter א. Uncial 047 received siglum ב1, Uncial 048 received ב2, Uncial 075 received ג, Codex Macedoniensis – ו, to name a few. When Greek and Hebrew letters ran out, Gregory assigned uncials numerals with an initial 0 (to distinguish them from the symbols of minuscule manuscripts). Codex Sinaiticus received the number 01, Alexandrinus – 02, Vaticanus – 03, Ephraemi – 04, etc. The last uncial manuscript known by Gregory received number 0161. Ernst von Dobschütz expanded the list of uncials through 0208 in 1933.

 over 320 sigla for uncial codices have been catalogued by the Institute for New Testament Textual Research (INTF) in Münster, Germany.

However, the 322 currently catalogued does not provide a precise count of all the New Testament Greek uncials. Uncial 0168 has been lost and over thirty manuscripts are associated with a smaller set of designations. Sometimes one number also applies to two separate manuscripts, as with uncial 092a and 092b, 0121a and 0121b, and 0278a and 0278b. Some other numerical designations should be reallocated to other lists: 055 (commentary), 0100 (lectionary), 0129 (lectionary), 0152 (talisman), 0153 (ostracon), 0192 (lectionary), 0195 (lectionary), 0203 (lectionary). Uncial 0212 from the 3rd or 4th century is more properly a witness to the Diatessaron than to the New Testament itself. So, the number 322 is merely nominal; the actual figure should be somewhat lower. Conversely, minuscule 1143, known as Beratinus 2, has some parts that were written in semi-uncial letters.

Legend 

 The numbers (#) are the now standard system of Gregory-Aland.
 Dates are estimated palaeographically by the INTF (except Codex Vaticanus 354 where the scribe gave a date — 949).
 Content generally only describes sections of the New Testament: Gospels (Gosp), The Acts of the Apostles (Acts), Pauline Epistles (Paul), Catholic epistles (CE), and so on. Sometimes the surviving portion of a codex is so limited that specific books, chapters or even verses can be indicated. Linked articles, where they exist, generally specify content in detail, by verse.
 Digital images are referenced with direct links to the hosting web pages, with the exception of those at the INTF. The quality and accessibility of the images is as follows:

† Indicates the manuscript has damaged or missing pages.
K Indicates manuscript also includes a commentary.
[ ] Brackets around Gregory-Aland number indicate the manuscript belongs to an already numbered manuscript, was found to not be a continuous text manuscript, is destroyed or presumed destroyed.

List of all registered New Testament uncial codices 
Only one uncial, Codex Sinaiticus has a complete text of the New Testament. Codex Alexandrinus has an almost complete text. It contains all books of the New Testament but lacks some leaves of Matthew (25), John (2), and Second Corinthians (3). Codex Vaticanus lacks the four last books, and the Epistle to the Hebrews is not complete. Codex Ephraemi has approximately 66 per cent of the New Testament. Uncials with designations higher than 046 typically have only one or two leaves.

Uncials with sigla 

The first 45 uncials have been assigned descriptive names as well as a single letter code called a siglum, for usage in academic writing. Beginning with uncial 046 the assignment of sigla was dropped and only a few manuscripts thereafter received a descriptive name.

Uncials 046-0100 

Beginning with 046, the use of identifying sigla was dropped, and very few uncials were given identifying names.

Uncials 0101-0200

Uncials 0201-0300

Uncials 0301–

Gallery

See also

Other lists of New Testament manuscripts 

 List of New Testament papyri
 List of New Testament minuscules
 List of New Testament lectionaries
 List of New Testament amulets
 List of New Testament Latin manuscripts
 List of New Testament Church Fathers
 Categories of New Testament manuscripts
 List of the Syriac New Testament manuscripts

Other articles 

 List of Egyptian papyri by date
 Novum Testamentum Graece
 Palaeography
 Biblical manuscript
 Textual criticism

Notes

References

Bibliography 

 
 Aland, Kurt, M. Welte, B. Köster and K. Junack. "Kurzgefasste Liste der griechischen Handschriften des Neuen Testaments". Berlin, New York: Walter de Gruyter, 1994.
 Gregory, Caspar René, "Die griechischen Handschriften des Neuen Testaments" (Leipzig 1908).
 
 Kenyon, Frederic. "Our Bible and the Ancient Manuscripts". Eyre & Spottiswoode: London, 1895, 1896, 1898, & 1939.
 Krodel, G. "New Manuscripts of the Greek New Testament". JBL 91/2 (Jun., 1972): 232–238.
 
 Scrivener, F. H. A. "A Plain Introduction to the Criticism of the New Testament". Fourth edition. Cambridge 1861, London 1894.
 Soden, Hermann von. "Die Schriften des Neuen Testaments, in ihrer ältesten erreichbaren Textgestalt hergestellt auf Grund ihrer Textgeschichte". Berlin 1902–1910.

External links

Lists of manuscripts 
 A Table of Greek Manuscripts
 Greek Codices of the Bible
 New Testament Greek MSS ordered by century (Compiled by Maurice Robinson)
 Greek Manuscript Quick Reference – The Life Foundations Nexus
 "Continuation of the Manuscript List" INTF, University of Münster. Retrieved September 8, 2009

Collections 
 The Schøyen Collection
 State Museums of Berlin
 Institut für Altertumskunde

Uncial Script Reading Practice 
 KoineGreek.com Ancient Audio Reader: Practice Reading the NT in Uncial Script with Audio Recording in Historical Pronunciation

Uncials
Literature lists
Greek New Testament manuscripts